Jennifer Bailey (born 23 December 1996) is a British female acrobatic gymnast. With partners Josephine Russell and Cicely Irwin, Bailey competed in the 2014 Acrobatic Gymnastics World Championships.

References

1996 births
Living people
British acrobatic gymnasts
Female acrobatic gymnasts
21st-century British women